Sankt Stefan im Gailtal (Slovene: Štefan na Zilji) is a small municipality in the district of Hermagor in the Austrian state of Carinthia.

Geography
Sankt Stefan lies on both sides of the Gail in the lower Gail valley between the main range of the Karnisch Alps on the south and the Gailtal Alps on the north.

References

Cities and towns in Hermagor District
Gailtal Alps
Carnic Alps